Fernando Luján (born Fernando Ciangherotti Díaz; August 23, 1938 – January 11, 2019) was a Mexican actor. He was a star of the silver screen in classic mexican films during the Golden Age of Mexican cinema.

His father; Alejandro Ciangherotti Erbelia, his mother; Mercedes Soler (Mercedes Diaz Pavia), brother Alejandro Ciangherotti Jr., wife Martha Mariana Castro, sons Fernando Ciangherotti, Fernando Canek and daughters Cassandra Ciangherotti and Vanessa Ciangherotti were or are also actors. He was not related to actress Daniela Luján.

Family
Luján was born in Bogota, Colombia, while his parents, both actors, were on tour presenting a play, but he never obtained Colombian nationality. He is the son of Alejandro Ciangherotti Erbelia and Mercedes Soler (Mercedes Diaz Pavia), the youngest of the famous Soler family. His late brother, Alejandro Ciangherotti, ex-wife, Adriana Parra, wife Martha Mariana Castro, children Fernando, Vanessa, Cassandra, Fernando Canek, Franco Paolo, granddaughter and son-in-law Vaita and Roberto Sosa, nephews Alejandro III, Alexis and Alan are also actors.

He has 10 children: 5 daughters and 5 sons.

Una vuelta al corazón
In 2009, his wife and daughter, Martha Mariana and Vanessa, produced a trilogy of the family in celebrating the ninth anniversary of Lo que callamos las mujeres, starring his children, nephews and granddaughter, where Vanessa and Fernando Ciangherotti serve as the director.

Acting career
He started his acting career as a child in the Cinema of Mexico credited as Fernando Ciangherotti, but changed his stage name to Fernando Luján a few years later. After appearing in more than eight films, mostly light comedies, he obtained a role in the telenovela Cuatro en la trampa at age twenty-three. The next eighteen years, he alternated his film career with television, culminating with the worldwide famous production Los ricos también lloran. The next twelve years, he did not participate in telenovelas and only starred in four films. He returned to television with Vida robada and Cadenas de amargura in 1991.

After participating in three other telenovelas for Televisa in the next five years, he signed a contract with TV Azteca to co-star with Angélica Aragón in the second telenovela of that new network titled Mirada de mujer. This telenovela was a success and would produce a sequel six years later. After Mirada de mujer, he obtained significant roles in film, especially as the star of the film-version of Gabriel García Márquez's book No One Writes to the Colonel in 1999 (El coronel no tiene quien le escriba). His performance in this film was qualified as "remarkable" by The New York Times. In 2005, he received the Ariel Award by the Mexican Academy of Film in honoring his career and contributions to film.

Death 
A long-time cigar smoker, Luján died on January 11, 2019, in Puerto Escondido at the age of 79.

Awards
Ariel Award in 2005
Diosa de plata ("Silver Goddess") to honor his career in the Cinema of Mexico
Fernando Luján was remembered as a "movie legend" at the 92nd Academy Awards ceremony on February 9, 2020.

Filmography

Film

 La cobarde (1953) as Julio, niño (uncredited)
 The Unfaithful (1953) as Luisito (uncredited)
 La segunda mujer (1953) as Rudy, niño
 Los que no deben nacer (1953)
 El mil amores (1954) as Ricardo Rodríguez
 La edad de la tentación (1959) as Eduardo
 La sombra en defensa de la juventud (1960)
 Dangers of Youth (1960) as Ricardo
 Vacaciones en Acapulco (1961) as Pepe
 Mañana serán hombres (1961) as Raúl, el muñeco
 Juventud rebelde (1961) as Denis
 Jóvenes y bellas (1961) as Raúl Paz
 El cielo y la tierra (1962) as Greñas
 Dile que la quiero (1963) as Greñas
 La sombra de los hijos (1963) (uncredited)
 Amor y sexo (1964) as Gallina, interno
 El pueblo fantasma (1965) as Rio Kid
 El gángster (1965) as Pedro
 Neutrón contra los asesinos del karate (1965) as Nephew
 Amor de adolescente (1965) as Raúl Linares
 Viento negro (1965) as Ingeniero Julio
 Joselito vagabundo (1966) as Fernando
 Tirando a gol (1966) as Pedro
 Que haremos con papá? (1966)
 Juventud sin ley (1966) as Jorge Ordorica
 Fiebre de juventud (1966) as Luis
 Lanza tus penas al viento (1966) as Gustavo
 Sólo para ti (1966) as Juan Negro
 Acapulco a go-go (1966) as Robert
 Los perversos a go go (1967) as Tony
 Un novio para dos hermanas (1967) as Fernando Martínez Dávila
 Novias impacientes (1967) as Luis Quintero
 Caballos de acero (1967)
 Báñame mi amor (1968)
 Un Latin lover en Acapulco (1968)
 Cuatro contra el crimen (1968) as Peter
 El Agente 00 Sexy (1968) as Ernesto Romero
 5 de chocolate y 1 de fresa (1968) as Miguel Ernesto Suárez
 Amor y esas cosas (1969) (segment "Adulterio formal, Un")
 Tres amigos (1970)
 Confesiones de una adolescente (1970)
 El oficio más antiguo del mundo (1970) as Miguel
 Cuerpazo del delito (1970) as Enrique (segment "La seductora")
 La hermana Dinamita (1970) as Dr. Tello
 Un amante anda suelto (1970)
 Los corrompidos (1971)
 Juegos de alcoba (1971) as Beto (segment: Paz y amor)
 El medio pelo (1972) as Doctor Sergio López
 Buscando una sonrisa (1972)
 La gatita (1972) as Rubén
 Besos, besos... y mas besos (1973) (segment "Dos veces por semana")
 Pilotos de combate (1973)
 La carrera del millón (1974)
 El alegre divorciado (1976) as Carlos Pozuelo
 El miedo no anda en burro (1976) as Raúl
 El patrullero 777 (1977) as Hombre suicida
 En la trampa (1979) as Alejandro
 Estas ruinas que ves (1979) as Paco Aldebarán
 La guerra de los pasteles (1979)
 Ese loco, loco hospital (1986)
 Más buenas que el pan (1987)
 Día de muertos (1988) as Francisco de Jesús Talamantes
 Solicito marido para engañar (1988) (uncredited)
 El garañón 2 (1990)
 Dos cuates a todo dar (1990)
 El último suspiro (1996)
 Fuera de la ley (1998)
 El coronel no tiene quien le escriba (1999) as The colonel
 En el país de no pasa nada (2000) as Enrique Laguardia
 Primer y último amor (2002) as Fermín Azcue
 El tigre de Santa Julia (2002) as Nando
 Tú te lo pierdes (2004) as Torcuato
 Las llaves de la independencia (2005) as Demetrio
 El carnaval de Sodoma (2006) as Padre Cándido
 Cañitas. Presencia (2007) as Don Fernando
 The Wind of Fear (2007) as Doctor Vila
 Insignificant Things (2008) as Augusto Gabrieli
 Cinco días sin Nora (2008) as José Kurtz
 El libro de las aguas (2008) as Ángel 1975
 Euforia (2009) as Duque
 Viento en contra (2011) as Justino Samperio
 Red Lips (2011) as Don Luis
 Tercera Llamada (2013) as Fernando
 Cásese quien pueda (2014) as Papá Méndes
 Selección Canina (2015) as Bernardo Lapata (voice)
 Manual de principiantes para ser presidente (2016) as Octogenario
 Cuando los hijos regresan (2017) as Manuel
 Overboard (2018) as Papi
 El refugio de los insomnes (2018) as Hombre Lobo (final film role)

Telenovelas
 Cuatro en la trampa (1961)
 La culpa de los padres (1963)
 Marina Lavalle (1965)
 El edificio de enfrente (1972) as Camilo
 Los que ayudan a Dios (1973)
 María José (1978) as El Jaiba
 Bella y bestia (1979) as Alfred
 Los ricos también lloran (1979) as Diego
 Vida robada (1991-1992) as Don Ramón
 Cadenas de amargura (1991) as Padre Julio
 Sueño de amor (1993)
 La paloma (1995)
 Para toda la vida (1996) as Juan Angel
 Mirada de mujer (1997) as Lic. Ignacio San Millán
 Todo por amor (2000-2001) as Gonzalo Robles
 Lo que es el amor (2001-2002) as Emiliano Lomelí
 Mirada de mujer: El regreso (2003) as Lic. Ignacio San Millán
 Las Juanas (2004) as Calixto Matamoros
 Montecristo (2006) as Alberto Lombardo
 Entre el amor y el deseo (2010-2011) as Edgar Dumont
 Quererte así (2012) as Alfred "Fred" Roth
 Los Rey (2012) as Everardo Rey Martínez
 Así en el barrio como en el cielo (2015) as Marcelo Ferrara

Series
 Pinche Pancho (2012)
 Ingobernable (2017) as Tomás Urquiza

References

External links

El coronel no tiene quien le escriba  review on The New York Times

1939 births
2019 deaths
Best Actor Ariel Award winners
Mexican male film actors
Mexican male telenovela actors
Mexican people of Italian descent
Male actors from Mexico City
People from Bogotá